Oxychilus lentiformis is a species of air-breathing land snail, a terrestrial pulmonate gastropod mollusk in the family Oxychilidae, the glass snails.

Distribution 
This species is found in:
 Majorca

References

Further reading 
  Altaba C. R.. 25 June 2007. Noves espècies del gènere Oxychilus de Mallorca. New species of Oxychilus from Mallorca. Malacofauna Balearica, 1: 17-22, Palma de Mallorca.

Oxychilus
Endemic fauna of the Balearic Islands
Gastropods described in 1882